Hua Takhe railway station is a railway station located in Lat Krabang Subdistrict, Lat Krabang District, Bangkok. This station is the nearest station to Suvarnabhumi Airport, as well as the nearest large railway station to King Mongkut's Institute of Technology Ladkrabang. However, the nearest railway station to KMITL is Phra Chom Klao halt, located only 830 m (2,723 ft) from Hua Takhe Station. Hua Takhe is also the junction (although not officially one) for the freight-only line to the Lat Krabang Inland Container Depot (ICD).

Train services 
 Ordinary train No. 275/276 Bangkok - Aranyaprathet - Bangkok
 Ordinary train No. 277/278 Bangkok - Kabin Buri - Bangkok
 Ordinary train No. 279/280 Bangkok - Aranyaprathet - Bangkok
 Ordinary train No. 281/282 Bangkok - Kabin Buri - Bangkok
 Ordinary train No. 283/284 Bangkok - Ban Phlu Ta Luang - Bangkok
 Ordinary train No. 285/286 Bangkok - Chachoengsao Junction - Bangkok
 Ordinary train No. 367/368 Bangkok - Chachoengsao Junction - Bangkok
 Ordinary train No. 371/372 Bangkok - Prachin Buri - Bangkok
 Ordinary train No. 376/378 Rangsit - Hua Takhe - Bangkok
 Ordinary train No. 379/380 Bangkok - Hua Takhe - Bangkok
 Ordinary train No. 381/382 Bangkok - Chachoengsao Junction - Bangkok
 Ordinary train No. 383/384 Bangkok - Chachoengsao Junction - Bangkok
 Ordinary train No. 385/386 Bangkok - Chachoengsao Junction - Bangkok
 Ordinary train No. 389/390 Bangkok - Chachoengsao Junction - Bangkok
 Ordinary train No. 391/394 Bangkok - Chachoengsao Junction - Bangkok

References 
 
 

Railway stations in Thailand